The 1996 McDonald's All-American Boys Game was an All-star basketball game played on Sunday, March 31, 1996 at the Pittsburgh Civic Arena in Pittsburgh, Pennsylvania. The game's rosters featured the best and most highly recruited high school boys graduating in 1996. The game was the 19th annual version of the McDonald's All-American Game first played in 1978.

1996 game
The game was telecast live by CBS. Ronnie Fields did not play, having suffered an injury in February 1996 that forced him to stay away from the basketball court for a long time. Charles Hathaway was also unable to play. Shaheen Holloway, who was the starting point guard for the East, won the MVP award with 7 points, 8 assists and 6 steals; other players who starred were guard Kobe Bryant (13 points/3 assists), center Vassil Evtimov (the only one to record a double-double with 14 points and 11 rebounds) and bench players Stephen Jackson (East) and Winfred Walton (West) who were the top scorers of the game, tied at 21 points. Of the 22 All-Americans, 12 did not play in the NBA, while 2 were drafted out of high school in the 1996 NBA Draft: Kobe Bryant (13th overall pick) and Jermaine O'Neal (17th overall pick). Only Ronnie Fields did not play a single game in the NCAA or the NBA.

East roster

West roster

Coaches
The East team was coached by:
 Head Coach John Miller of Blackhawk High School (Beaver Falls, Pennsylvania)
 Asst Coach Rick Bell of Peters Township High School (McMurray, Pennsylvania)
 Asst Coach Don Graham of North Catholic High School (Pittsburgh, Pennsylvania)

The West team was coached by:
 Head Coach Nate Harris of Booker T. Washington High School (Tulsa, Oklahoma)
 Asst Coach Levi Brown of Booker T. Washington High School (Tulsa, Oklahoma)

All-American Week

Contest winners 
 The 1996 Slam Dunk contest was won by Lester Earl.
 The 1996 3-point shoot-out was won by Nate James.

References

External links
McDonald's All-American on the web
McDonald's All-American all-time rosters
McDonald's All-American rosters at Basketball-Reference.com
Game stats at Realgm.com

1995–96 in American basketball
1996
1996 in sports in Pennsylvania
Basketball competitions in Pennsylvania
Basketball in Pittsburgh